Riza Zogolli was a 19th-century Albanian politician. He was the brother of Xhemal Pasha Zogolli, father of King Zog I of Albania and one of the promoters and delegates of the Albanian Declaration of Independence.

References

Bibliography
 Patrice Najbor, Histoire de l'Albanie et de sa maison royale (5 volumes), JePublie, Paris, 2008,.
 Patrice Najbor, la dynastye des Zogu, Textes & Prétextes, Paris, 2002

External links 
Maison royale d'Albanie, site officiel en langue française
Famille royale d'Albanie, site officiel en langue anglaise

19th-century Albanian people
Albanian Sunni Muslims
Year of death missing
Year of birth missing
All-Albanian Congress delegates
House of Zogu